Biarritz is a city in France.

Biarritz may also refer to

Geography
Biarritz, Uruguay, a seaside resort in Canelones Department, Uruguay
Villa Biarritz, a section of the Punta Carretas neighbourhood in Montevideo, Uruguay

Sports
Biarritz Olympique, a French professional rugby union team based in the city of Biarritz
Club Biguá de Villa Biarritz, a Uruguayan sports club based in the city of Montevideo

Transport
Biarritz – Anglet – Bayonne Airport, an airport in southern France
Cadillac Eldorado Biarritz, a convertible

Other uses
Biarritz (novel), a novel by Hermann Goedsche